Tichvinskia is an extinct genus of procolophonid parareptile from the Early Triassic of Russia.

References

Procolophonids
Triassic parareptiles
Extinct animals of Russia
Prehistoric reptile genera